Ellis Price Morningstar (August 9, 1902 – February 28, 1982) was a politician in Ontario, Canada. He was a Progressive Conservative member of the Legislative Assembly of Ontario from 1951 until 1975 who represented the riding of Welland.

Background
Morningstar was a lifelong resident of Welland, Ontario.

Politics
He was first elected in the general election in 1951 and was subsequently re-elected in the general elections in 1955, 1959, 1963, 1967 and 1971, winning by large margins. He served on a variety of Standing and Select Committees, as a Member of successive PC governments under Premiers Leslie Frost, John Robarts and Bill Davis. He retired from politics in 1975. He was the longest serving MPP from the riding of Welland.

References

External links
 

1902 births
1982 deaths
Progressive Conservative Party of Ontario MPPs
People from Leamington, Ontario
People from Welland